Ryan Pitts (born October 1, 1985) is a former United States Army soldier and the ninth living recipient of the Medal of Honor from the War in Afghanistan.

Early life
Pitts grew up in Mont Vernon, New Hampshire. As a child, in kindergarten, Pitts wanted to join the army. In 2003, he graduated from Souhegan High School.

Military service
Pitts joined the United States Army in 2003 and attended One Station Unit Training at Fort Sill. After completing training Pitt was assigned to the 319th Field Artillery Regiment until 2005; afterwards he was assigned to the 503rd Infantry Regiment until 2009. During his time in the army, Pitt deployed twice to Afghanistan: in 2005 for 12 months, and in 2007 for 15 months.

Medal of Honor action
On July 13, 2008. Early that morning, while Sergeant Pitts was providing perimeter security at Observation Post Topside, a well-organized Anti-Afghan Force consisting of over 200 members initiated a close proximity sustained and complex assault using accurate and intense rocket-propelled grenade, machine gun and small arms fire on Wanat Vehicle Patrol Base. An immediate wave of rocket-propelled grenade rounds engulfed the Observation Post wounding Sergeant Pitts and inflicting heavy casualties. Sergeant Pitts had been knocked to the ground and was bleeding heavily from shrapnel wounds to his arm and legs, but with incredible toughness and resolve, he subsequently took control of the observation post and returned fire on the enemy. As the enemy drew nearer, Sergeant Pitts threw grenades, holding them after the pin was pulled and the safety lever was released to allow a nearly immediate detonation on the hostile forces. Unable to stand on his own and near death because of the severity of his wounds and blood loss, Sergeant Pitts continued to lay suppressive fire until a two-man reinforcement team arrived. Sergeant Pitts quickly assisted them by giving up his main weapon and gathering ammunition all while continually lobbing fragmentary grenades until these were expended. At this point, Sergeant Pitts crawled to the northern position radio and described the situation to the command post as the enemy continued to try and isolate the Observation Post from the main Patrol Base. With the enemy close enough for him to hear their voices and with total disregard for his own life, Sergeant Pitts whispered in radio situation reports and conveyed information that the Command Post used to provide indirect fire support. Sergeant Pitts' courage, steadfast commitment to the defense of his unit and ability to fight while seriously wounded prevented the enemy from overrunning the observation post and capturing fallen American soldiers, and ultimately prevented the enemy from gaining fortified positions on higher ground from which to attack Wanat Vehicle Patrol Base.

Post-military life
Initially Pitts was recommended to receive a Distinguished Service Cross. Pitts was awarded the Medal of Honor on July 21, 2014, for actions on July 13, 2008, during the Battle of Wanat. As part of the 173rd Airborne Brigade, Sergeant Pitts served as a Forward Observer. Along with Salvatore Giunta and Kyle J. White, Pitts is the third recipient of the Medal of Honor from 2nd Battalion, 503rd Infantry Regiment. Pitts was medically discharged in 2009.

Personal life
Pitts lives in Nashua, New Hampshire, with his wife Amy and son, Lucas. Pitts graduated from the University of New Hampshire at Manchester with a bachelor's degree in Business.  He works in business development for Oracle. In 2015, Pitts was proclaimed as "New Englander of the Year" by his alma mater. Pitts describes himself as a "private" individual, who does not enjoy the limelight.

Awards and decorations

Military awards 

Staff Sergeant Pitts has also been awarded 2 service stripes and 4 Overseas Service Bars.

Medal of Honor citation

The President of the United States of America, authorized by Act of Congress, March 3, 1863, has awarded in the name of Congress the Medal of Honor to

For conspicuous gallantry and intrepidity at the risk of his life above and beyond the call of duty:

See also

 List of Afghanistan Medal of Honor recipients

References

External links

Staff Sergeant Ryan Pitts Medal of Honor
President Obama Presents the Medal of Honor to Staff Sergeant Ryan M. Pitts 
 Ryan Pitts Interview at the Pritzker Military Museum & Library

1985 births
Living people
United States Army personnel of the War in Afghanistan (2001–2021)
War in Afghanistan (2001–2021) recipients of the Medal of Honor
United States Army Medal of Honor recipients
United States Army soldiers
People from Lowell, Massachusetts
People from Nashua, New Hampshire